Michał Jonczyk (born 11 March 1992) is a Polish former footballer. He played for the Poland national under-18 and under-19 football teams.

Club career
Jonczyk began his career when he was 9 years old at Piotrcovia Piotrków Trybunalski, but moved to GKS Bełchatów when Piotrcovia youth team disbanded in 2005. He plays as a striker, but is also known to play on the left wing. In December 2007 he joined U.C. Sampdoria for a trial. Shortly after coming back he was invited by Fulham F.C. for a trial. In August 2008 he joined Płomień Jerzmanowice to play in the Polish Fourth Division. He was the best goal scorer of Płomień in spring 2008, scoring five goals in six matches. In March 2009 he moved to Wisła Kraków (MESA) team. On 4 July 2009, he signed a two-year contract with Sandecja Nowy Sącz. He made 26 appearances in the Polish First League and scored 7 goals. In June 2010, he signed a three-year contract with Ekstraklasa side Górnik Zabrze.

International career
Jonczyk made his debut for the Poland national under-15 football team on 17 April 2007, scored twice against Slovakia. He played for the Poland national under-16 football team in 2007 and 2008. In 2008 and 2009 he played for the Poland national under-17 football team. He played in all three matches in UEFA European Under-17 Championship qualifying round and scored two goals in matches against Montenegro and Azerbaijan. On 26 March 2009 Jonczyk scored two goals in UEFA European Under-17 Championship elite round match against Slovenia. On 31 March 2009 he scored two goals in UEFA European Under-17 Championship elite round match against Greece. On 13 August 2009 he played his first match for Poland national under-19 football team. Two days later he scored his first goal for under-19 national team.

References

External links 
 

1992 births
Sportspeople from Piotrków Trybunalski
Living people
Polish footballers
Poland youth international footballers
Association football forwards
Górnik Zabrze players
GKS Bełchatów players
Wisła Kraków players
Sandecja Nowy Sącz players
Widzew Łódź players
Motor Lublin players
Ekstraklasa players
I liga players
II liga players